Che Clark (born 22 April 2003) is a New Zealand rugby sevens player.

Clark was named in the All Blacks Sevens squad for the 2022 Commonwealth Games in Birmingham. He won a bronze medal at the event.

References

External links
All Blacks Profile

2003 births
Living people
New Zealand international rugby sevens players
Commonwealth Games rugby sevens players of New Zealand
New Zealand male rugby sevens players
Commonwealth Games medallists in rugby sevens
New Zealand rugby union players
Rugby sevens players at the 2022 Commonwealth Games
Commonwealth Games bronze medallists for New Zealand
Medallists at the 2022 Commonwealth Games